Orlin Collier (February 17, 1907 – September 9, 1944) was a Major League Baseball pitcher for the Detroit Tigers. He was married to Ruth Collier. Together they had one daughter, Dorisanna Collier. He died at the age of 37, suffering a fatal heart attack on a train during the return trip from a game.

External links

1907 births
1944 deaths
People from Mississippi County, Missouri
Detroit Tigers players
Baseball players from Missouri
Major League Baseball pitchers
Minor league baseball managers
Montgomery Lions players
Fort Smith Twins players
Beaumont Exporters players
Evansville Hubs players
Toronto Maple Leafs (International League) players
Williamsport Grays players
Montreal Royals players
Birmingham Barons players
Milwaukee Brewers (minor league) players
Toledo Mud Hens players
Nashville Vols players
Baltimore Orioles (IL) players
Knoxville Smokies players
Jackson Generals (KITTY League) players
Ole Miss Rebels baseball players